The Women's 50 metre butterfly S5 swimming event at the 2004 Summer Paralympics was competed on 22 September. It was won by Teresa Perales, representing .

Final round

22 Sept. 2004, evening session

References

W
2004 in women's swimming